The 18th Biathlon European Championships were held in Ridnaun, Italy from February 21 to February 27, 2011.

There were total of 15 competitions held: sprint, pursuit and individual both for U26 and U21, relay races for U26 and a mixed relay for U21.

Schedule of events 

The schedule of the event stands below. All times in CET.

Results

U26

Men's

Women's

U21

Men's

Women's

Mixed

Medal table

External links 
 Stadium
 IBU full results
 OC Ridnaun Prepared for 2011 Open European Championships
 New Stadium Ready for OECH
 Stars at the IBU OECH in Ridnaun
 Döll Wins 15K over Pidhrushna and Glazyrina
 Germany Tops Russia in Sprint Finish
 Ukrainians Golden in Women’s Relay
 Eberhard and Akimov Take Ridnaun Sprints
 Second Title in Ridnaun for Julianne Döll
 Volkov wins Gold for Russia
 Hat Trick for Döll in Ridnaun

 
Biathlon European Championships
International sports competitions hosted by Italy
2011 in biathlon
2011 in Italian sport